On January 28, 1965 around 2:30 a.m., a man bombed three American warplanes being retrofitted at an airport in Edmonton, Alberta, Canada.

Background
The United States Air Force had flown 112 aircraft to the Edmonton Industrial Airport, where they were to be repaired by Northwest Industries.

Although initial reports pointed out that 15 of the planes had run spy missions over post-Revolution China, the attack was said to be in protest of the Vietnam War. It is believed to have been one of the first attacks ever citing the involvement of the U.S. in the Vietnam War as its motive.

Attack
A security guard, Threnton James Richardson, was bound, gagged, and then shot with a rifle, when the perpetrator entered the airport.

Two F-84 jets were destroyed, and a third heavily damaged by the bombing.

Following the attack, an unemployed German immigrant, Harry Waldeman Freidrich Hubach, was arrested by police and charged with the murder of the security guard.

Hubach was found guilty and sentenced to hang. But upon appeal and a new trial he pleaded guilty to non-capital murder and was sentenced to life in prison. Released, he turned his life around, married and ran a successful business, finally dying around 2005 in Kingston, Ontario.

References

1965 murders in Canada
Acts of sabotage
Canada–United States relations
Crime in Edmonton
Deaths by firearm in Alberta
Far-left politics in Canada
Far-left terrorism
History of Edmonton
Improvised explosive device bombings in Canada
Opposition to United States involvement in the Vietnam War
Terrorist incidents in Canada in the 1960s
Terrorist incidents in North America in 1965